Paul Bril (1554 – 7 October 1626) was a Flemish painter and printmaker principally known for his landscapes.  He spent most of his active career in Rome. His Italianate landscapes had a major influence on landscape painting in Italy and Northern Europe.

Life

Paul Bril is believed to have been born in Antwerp although his birthplace may have been Breda. He was the son of the painter Matthijs Bril the Elder.  Paul and his older brother Matthijs likely started their artistic training with their father in Antwerp. Paul may also have been a student of the Antwerp painter Damiaen Wortelmans who was specialised in the decoration of harpsichords.

Matthijs moved to Rome probably around 1575. Here he worked on several frescoes in the Vatican Palace. It is believed Paul joined his brother in Rome around or after 1582.

When Matthijs died in 1583, his brother likely continued his work, picking up many of Matthijs' commissions.  Paul's earliest known works date from the late 1580s. He established his reputation with commissions from Pope Gregory XIII in the Collegio Romano. His success was assured after Pope Sixtus V became his principal patron. Bril was part of a team specialized in landscape painting and thus participated in almost every assignment which entailed decorative landscapes, such as in the Basilica di Santa Maria Maggiore, the Vatican Palace and the Scala Santa. Another important early commission was the fresco cycle in the Santa Cecilia in Trastevere in Rome of around 1599. 

Pope Clement VIII also became his patron and gave the artist a commission for a monumental seascape on the Martyrdom of St. Clement. Paul Bril completed this commission  in the Vatican Palace’s Sala Clementina in collaboration with the brothers Giovanni and Cherubino Alberti (1600–02/3). In 1601 Paul received another major commission, to paint a series of large canvases featuring properties of the Mattei family. Paul further painted landscape frescoes in the Casino dell'Aurora of the Palazzo Pallavicini-Rospigliosi in Rome.

His patrons were among the most influential people in Rome and included members from the Colonna, Borghese, Mattei and Barberini families in Rome as well as Cardinal Federico Borromeo in Milan, Cardinal Carlo de’ Medici in Florence and Duke Ferdinando Gonzaga in Mantua.

In 1621, Paul Bril became director of the Accademia di San Luca, the artists' academy in Rome. This was a clear sign of the high esteem in which he was held by his fellow artists in Rome as he was the first foreigner to hold this position.

He had many students including his son Cyriacus Bril, Luigi Carboni, Balthasar Lauwers, Willem van Nieulandt II, Pieter Spierinckx, Agostino Tassi and Hendrick Cornelisz Vroom.  Karel Philips Spierincks may also briefly have been his pupil.

Paul Bril died in Rome in 1626.

Work

Paul Bril initially painted in the late Mannerist style developed by his brother. These early landscapes are in the Flemish tradition inaugurated by Joachim Patinir and Pieter Bruegel the Elder and further developed by his own brother. Works from this early period were characterised by a picturesque arrangement of landscape elements and violent contrasts between light and dark. These early paintings also show strong contrasts of forms to create a sense of dramatic motion. Bril contrasted steep cliffs with chasms or dark, twisting trees growing from hills next to flat, sunlit pastures.

His style changed during his stay in Rome. His compositions became calmer and his style more classicising around 1605. This may have been due to the influence of Annibale Carracci and Adam Elsheimer. The works from this period have lower horizons and less abrupt transitions from foreground to background. The subjects are typically pastoral or bucolic scenes and mythological subjects.  This late style had a strong influence on the development of Flemish landscape painting and was crucial to Claude Lorrain's formation of the classical landscape.

Agostino Tassi may have been Paul's pupil. Tassi later became the master of Claude Lorrain. Paul Bril thus forms one of the links between the panoramic views of Joachim Patinir and the ideal landscape evolved by Nicolas Poussin and Claude Lorrain. Bril is considered a precursor of the Dutch Italianates such as Cornelius van Poelenburgh and Bartholomeus Breenbergh, and, to a certain extent, of the Flemish and Dutch genre painters active in Rome known as the Bamboccianti.

Paul also painted small cabinet paintings on copper and panel commencing from the 1590s. Some of these he signed with a pair of glasses, a pun on the Flemish word bril which means "glasses". These small-scale paintings depicted subjects that he and his brother had rendered before on a large scale, such as tempestuous seascapes, hermits in the wilderness, travelling pilgrims, peasants among ancient ruins, hunters and fishermen.

A prolific draftsman, his drawings were popular with collectors and were copied by the many students who worked with him in his studio, which was a popular destination for Dutch and Flemish artists visiting Rome.

He often collaborated on paintings with Johann Rottenhammer. According to a dealer's letter of 1617, Rottenhammer painted the figures in Venice and then sent the plates to Rome for Bril to complete the landscape. Bril also collaborated with his friends Jan Brueghel the Elder and Adam Elsheimer, whom he both influenced and was influenced by.  His collaboration with Elsheimer is shown in a painting now in Chatsworth House.  Bril introduced Jan Brueghel the Elder to Cardinal Federico Borromeo, who subsequently became Brueghel's most important patron. He also let the Dutch landscape artist Bartholomeus Breenbergh live in his Roman residence for many years.

See also
 River View with Rocks, oil on copper anonymous copy of an original by Bril

References

Further reading
Peter and Linda Murray, The Penguin Dictionary of Art and Artists.  Fifth Edition: Revised and Enlarged (Penguin Books, London, 1988), 51.
Carla Hendriks, Northern Landscapes on Roman Walls: The Frescoes of Matthijs and Paul Bril. (Florence : Centro Di della Edifimi, c2003).
Rudolf Baer, Paul Bril: Studien zur Entwicklungsgeschichte der Landschaftsmalerei um 1600. (Munich: J.B. Grassi, 1930).
Hanno Hahn, Paul Bril in Caprarola. Miscellanea Bibliothecae Hertzianae, Roma, 1961. 
Francesca Cappelletti, Paul Bril e la pittura di paesaggio a Roma, 1580-1630. (Rome: Ugo Bozzi, c.2006).
Louisa Wood Ruby, Paul Bril: The Drawings. (Turnhout: Brepols, 1999).
Anton Mayer, Das Leben und die Werke der Brueder Matthaeus und Paul Brill. (Leipzig: K.W. Hiersemann, 1910).
Giorgio T. Faggin, Per Paolo Bril, in Paragone, CLXXXV, 1965.

External links

1554 births
1626 deaths
16th-century Flemish painters
17th-century Flemish painters
Artists from the Spanish Netherlands
Flemish Renaissance painters
Flemish landscape painters
Fresco painters
Painters from Antwerp